Alvin and the Chipmunks is an American animated television series featuring the Chipmunks, which was produced by Bagdasarian Productions in association with Ruby-Spears Enterprises from 1983 to 1987, Murakami-Wolf-Swenson in 1988 and DIC Enterprises from 1988 to 1990.

Much of the overseas animation was done by Hanho Heung-Up for Seasons 2-5. The Murakami-Wolf-Swenson episodes were animated by A-1 Productions. The last Season was animated by Sei Young Animation.

The show aired from September 17, 1983, to December 1, 1990, on NBC and is the follow-up to the original 1961–62 series, The Alvin Show. The show introduced the Chipettes, three female Chipmunks with their female caretaker, Miss Beatrice Miller (who joined the cast in 1986). In 1988, the show switched production companies to DIC Enterprises; the first 11 episodes of season 6 were produced by Murakami-Wolf-Swenson, and the series was renamed to The Chipmunks.

In 1987, during the show's fifth season, the Chipmunks' first animated feature film, The Chipmunk Adventure, was released in cinemas by The Samuel Goldwyn Company. The film was directed by Janice Karman and featured the Chipmunks and Chipettes in a contest traveling around the world.

In the show's eighth and final season, the show's name was changed to The Chipmunks Go to the Movies. Each episode was a spoof of a Hollywood film like Back to the Future or King Kong. Several television specials featuring the characters were also released. In 1990, the special Rockin' Through the Decades was produced. That year, the Chipmunks also teamed up with other well-known cartoon characters (such as Bugs Bunny, Daffy Duck, Michelangelo, and Garfield) for the drug abuse-prevention special Cartoon All-Stars to the Rescue.

Characters 
The Chipmunks: The main characters of the series
 Alvin Seville: The oldest brother and leader of the Chipmunks, Alvin is the talented troublemaker and leader of the group. He tends to start chaos and can be rather narcissistic at times, but he's actually sweet and golden-hearted at his core.
 Simon Seville: The middle brother and tallest, Simon is the intelligent realist and the most responsible of the group. Season 1 was the only time he would wear his original black glasses with white lenses as he did in the 1960s TV show Starting with season 2, Simon's glasses became blue with clear lenses, and so continued to be throughout the series. However, the original Simon with the black glasses can still be seen in the intro and title cards for seasons 2–5.
 Theodore Seville: The youngest brother of the group, Theodore is the sensitive and lovable one of the group.
 The Chipettes: The Chipmunks' female counterparts and on-and-off girlfriends
 Brittany Miller: The oldest sister and the leader of the Chipettes, Brittany is Alvin's counterpart. She is as equally vain and self-centered as Alvin is, but like him, really does care about others.
 Jeanette Miller: The middle sister and tallest, Jeanette is Simon's counterpart. However, unlike Simon, who is able to stand up to Alvin, she does not stand up to Brittany as easily. She is also very smart, which is what she does have in common with Simon. However, she is very shy and clumsy.
 Eleanor Miller: The youngest sister, Eleanor is Theodore's counterpart. She shares his love for food and cooking, but she is more athletic, more intelligent, and more likely to stand up to Brittany than Theodore is to Alvin.
 David (Dave) Seville: The Chipmunks' adoptive father, the Chipettes' guardian, songwriter, and manager. Dave's patience is tested nearly every day by Alvin until he is reduced to his famous yell of "ALVIN!!!" He can get frustrated with Simon and Theodore too sometimes as Alvin often gets them into mischief, but regardless, he loves all of his boys equally.
 Miss Beatrice Miller: The kindly, absent-minded adoptive mother of the Chipettes.
 Cookie Chomper III: The Chipmunks' first pet, Cookie Chomper III was a stray kitten who found his way into the Seville residence one night while Dave was working late. For a time, the Chipmunks kept him a secret from Dave until the kitten made his presence known. Dave allowed them to keep Cookie Chomper III, and he became their pet. But one evening, Cookie Chomper left through an open window in the Chipmunks' bedroom, then was hit by a car and killed. The Chipmunks all grieved, but Alvin was hurt most of all and even blamed himself. Dave reassured the boys that it wasn't their fault and helped them remember the happy times they had with Cookie Chomper III. Most NBC stations refused to air the episode due to its plot.
 Lilly: The Chipmunks' puppy who they adopted from the shelter following the death of their original pet, Cookie Chomper III.
 Vinny: The Chipmunks' birth mother (originally voiced by June Foray, then by Janice Karman). The Chipmunks find their long-lost mother after days of searching. Alvin gets upset because he doesn't understand why she abandoned them. Their mother explains that the year she abandoned them there was a horrible winter and all of the animals in the forest were forced to leave their homes. She realized that they wouldn't survive the journey if she brought them with her, so she decided to leave them with a nice man who was always kind to the forest animals (Dave). She told them that when spring came and she could finally return to get them, she saw how happy they were with Dave, and thought they would be better off with him. Eventually, Alvin forgives his mother. They return to Dave, but the brothers agree to keep in touch with their mother. In a later episode, she and Dave clash on how to bring the boys up. Eventually, they make up.

Voice cast

Main 
 Ross Bagdasarian, Jr. as Alvin Seville, Simon Seville, Dave Seville, Grandpa Seville (second voice), most additional male voices (1988–1991)
 Janice Karman as Theodore Seville, Brittany Miller, Jeanette Miller, and Eleanor Miller, most additional female voices (1988–1991)
 Dody Goodman as Beatrice Miller
 Thomas H. Watkins as Uncle "Adventure" Willy, Lilly the dog (1988–1991)
 Rainy Hayes as Chipette Song vocal artist
 Sherwood Ball as Chipmunk Song vocal artist
 Vanessa Bagdasarian
 Michael Bagdasarian

Additional 
 Mary Kay Bergman
 Derek Barton
 Julie Brown
 Booker Bradshaw
 Johnny Brown
 Natalie Brown
 Rodger Bumpass
 Arthur Burghardt
 Ruth Buzzi
 Nancy Cartwright
 Philip Clarke
 Henry Corden
 Peter Cullen
 Jim Cummings
 Julie Dees
 Alan Dinehart
 Walker Edmiston
 Jack Enyart
 Al Fann
 Ron Feinberg
 June Foray
 Johnny Haymer
 Stanley Jones
 Katie Leigh
 Barry Livingston
 Keye Luke
 Tress MacNeille - Museum Attendant, Missy Snootson ("My Pharaoh Lady") 
 Kerrigan Mahan
 Gail Matthius
 Shep Menken
 Howard Morris
 Clive Revill
 Rudy Ramos
 Robert Ridgely
 Ken Sansom
 Marilyn Schreffler
 Bill Scott
 Amy Tunick
 Janet Waldo
 Eric Wallace
 B.J. Ward
 Frank Welker
 Alan Young
 Cameron Young

Episodes

Original network run 
The series made its debut on September 17, 1983, on NBC, originally under the name Alvin and The Chipmunks, and was animated by Ruby-Spears Enterprises. Beginning with the 1988–89 season, the series was renamed to simply The Chipmunks, and production switched to Murakami-Wolf-Swenson (for 11 episodes of the 6th season) and DIC Enterprises (for 13 episodes of the 6th season, and for the 7th and 8th season) for the remainder of the series' run. For its final season in 1990, the series was renamed again, this time, The Chipmunks Go to the Movies, as all episodes in this season were spoofs of popular Hollywood movies.

Syndication package 
The series went into syndication in the fall of 1988 under the original Alvin and The Chipmunks title, distributed by Lorimar-Telepictures (and later Warner Bros. Television after Warner Communications' purchase of Lorimar, Warner Bros. would later buy the pre-1991 library of Ruby-Spears in 1996 as part of its acquisition of Turner, where the library previously sat). The package contained all 52 episodes produced by Ruby-Spears (#901–952), as well as the Valentine's and Reunion specials. To round the package out to the common-practice syndication package length of 65 episodes (5 days a week for 13 weeks, allowing for exactly four cycles a year), an additional 11 episodes were produced specifically for the package by Murakami-Wolf-Swenson. In the syndication order, these episodes followed the 54 Ruby-Spears shows; in the fall 1988 cycle (September 12 – December 9), they aired from November 25 – December 9. Episodes were time-compressed (similar to PAL speed-up) and/or trimmed in an effort to make room for more commercials. Telepictures began distributing the series in June 1985 for $30 Million, with the rights purchased for a record $385,000 a half-hour. The syndication package did not include the episodes that aired on NBC from season six onward, meaning that the final thirty-nine episodes of the series were not shown in reruns outside of the network.

The 65-episode syndication package was later carried by Nickelodeon, then Cartoon Network, and finally Boomerang in the United States. In Canada, the original run of the show was aired on the Global Television Network, while the package was later carried on Teletoon Retro until that channel’s dissolution in 2015. After the dissolution of Teletoon Retro, the show hasn't been seen in North America since then.

The syndication package was also carried overseas in the mid-1990s when it aired on Cartoon Network, later Nickelodeon, and finally Channel 5's Milkshake! block in the United Kingdom. In Brazil, TV Globo aired the series with Brazilian dubs. During that time, HIT Entertainment distributed the series outside North America.

References

External links 

 

Alvin and the Chipmunks
1983 American television series debuts
1990 American television series endings
NBC original programming
1980s American animated television series
1980s American musical comedy television series
1990s American animated television series
1990s American musical comedy television series
Television series by Ruby-Spears
Television series by DIC Entertainment
Television series by Lorimar Television
American children's animated comedy television series
American children's animated musical television series
English-language television shows
Animated television series about brothers
Animated television series about children
Animated television series about mammals
YTV (Canadian TV channel) original programming
Television series by Lorimar-Telepictures
Television series created by Ross Bagdasarian Jr.
Television series created by Janice Karman
HIT Entertainment